Protium inconforme is a species of plant in the Burseraceae family. It is endemic to Panama.  It is threatened by habitat loss.

References

Endemic flora of Panama
inconforme
Vulnerable plants
Taxonomy articles created by Polbot